James Carlos "Bimby" Aquino Yap Jr. (born April 19, 2007) is a Filipino media personality and child actor. He made his film debut in My Little Bossings (2013).

Early life
Yap was born to television host and actress Kris Aquino and basketball player James Yap.

Personal life
He is currently home schooled. In 2016, he experienced a concussion on the head.

Career
Before Yap's movie debut in My Little Bossings, he first appeared in TV commercials and billboards together with his mother, such as Nido, San Marino Corned Tuna.

Filmography

Film

Television

Accolades

Ancestry

References

Footnotes

2007 births
21st-century Filipino male actors
Cojuangco family
Filipino male television actors
Filipino male child actors
Filipino people of Chinese descent
Kapampangan people
Living people
People from Makati
Male actors from Metro Manila
Star Magic
Aquino family